The Edward Simon Lewis House is an historic house, located at 456 N Street, Southwest, Washington, D.C. in the Southwest Waterfront neighborhood.

History
The house was completed around 1815 and renovated in 1966.

It has been listed on the District of Columbia Inventory of Historic Sites since 1964 and it was listed on the National Register of Historic Places in 1973.

References

External links

https://web.archive.org/web/20151205091648/http://www.archiplanet.org/wiki/Lewis,_Edward_Simon,_House

Houses completed in 1815
Federal architecture in Washington, D.C.
Houses on the National Register of Historic Places in Washington, D.C.